John J. Clark is an American former basketball player. He played college basketball for the Northeastern Huskies from 1972 to 1976 where he graduated as the team's all-time leading scorer.

Clark was selected by the Boston Celtics in the sixth round of the 1976 NBA draft.

Clark was inducted into the Northeastern Varsity Club Hall of Fame in 1987. His coach Jim Calhoun referred to him as "the complete student/athlete."

References

Year of birth missing (living people)
Living people
American men's basketball players
Basketball players from Pittsburgh
Boston Celtics draft picks
Guards (basketball)
Northeastern Huskies men's basketball players